"Goodnight, Seattle", by Christopher Lloyd and Joe Keenan, is the series finale of the American sitcom Frasier. It aired on NBC on May 13, 2004, in the 11th year of the series. In syndication, it is a two-part episode.

Plot

Frasier (Kelsey Grammer) is on an airplane when he is surprised by the anxiety the woman sitting next to him suffers during the flight. The woman introduces herself as Dr. Anne Ranberg (Jennifer Beals), also a psychiatrist, and after brief deliberation, Frasier decides to disclose what is on his mind, in hopes that it will help pass the time on the flight.

Frasier's girlfriend, Charlotte (Laura Linney), is leaving for Chicago, leaving Frasier devoid of any current love life. To commemorate her leaving for Chicago, Frasier and Charlotte sleep together on her final night in Seattle, resulting in a problem as Frasier misses his regularly scheduled radio show, which results in station manager Kenny Daly taking over at the last minute who quickly starts to enjoy himself. Once Frasier arrives, he bumps into his agent Bebe, where he learns about a job opening on a San Francisco television network after a death occurred there, but Frasier quickly declines, citing his comfort with his present situation at KACL. In the meantime, his brother Niles (David Hyde Pierce) and Niles' wife Daphne (Jane Leeves) are anticipating the birth of their child, while his father, Martin (John Mahoney), is set to be married to Ronee (Wendie Malick). A mishap occurs when Martin schedules the wedding for May 15 instead of July 15. Frasier and Niles agree to plan the wedding in eight days.

As the two are frantically putting the wedding together, both Frasier and Niles encounter numerous difficulties. Three of Daphne's brothers, Simon, Stephen, and Michael, are in Seattle in anticipation of Daphne's childbirth. Frasier has arranged for a ceremonial cannon-firing when Martin and Ronee are officially declared married. However, the person Frasier puts in position gets heat stroke from standing out in the sun too long, making him unusable. Michael volunteers to do the job instead and is told the cue from Frasier. However, Frasier and Niles also have to deal with finding a new flower girl, as the three brothers have accidentally intoxicated her, rendering her unconscious. Roz (Peri Gilpin) allows her daughter Alice to do the job in the flower girl's stead, but upon receiving the same cue as Michael was told, Michael fires off the cannon, creating havoc in the neighborhood. Daphne and Niles realize Eddie has eaten the rings and take him to a local veterinarian. While they are at the vet's office, Daphne goes into labor. Frasier, Martin, and Ronee all hurry to the clinic, where Daphne has given birth to the couple's first son. (The baby’s name, David, is a tribute to show writer/creator David Angell.) Ronee suggests that she and Martin get married in the clinic, so Daphne and Niles do not miss out, and Frasier marries them.

Later, a mover (the same from the first episode) returns to Frasier's residence to take away Martin's chair. Frasier calls Lilith to ask after Frederick. Afterwards, he finds himself with the peace and quiet he was once desperate for. However, with Martin having moved out and Niles and Daphne busy with their new son, Frasier realizes that he is lonely. He decides to take the job in San Francisco. The following day, Frasier and his colleagues learn that Roz has been promoted to station manager after Kenny quits to become a DJ. Frasier invites his brother, father, Daphne, Ronee, and Roz to his apartment to announce his move to San Francisco. However, before the dinner, Frasier begins handing out gifts of significance. When an ominous phone call answered by the answering machine from a doctor reveals potentially bad news regarding Frasier's future outlook, the attendees fear the worst. Frasier then informs them of his impending move to San Francisco, where his new show will begin the following week. Later, during the celebration, Frasier reveals his reasoning for taking the job, citing that with Daphne and Niles' child, Martin and Ronee's marriage, and Roz's promotion, each of them have now begun a new phase of their lives, and that he now desires to do the same. Frasier then recites Alfred Lord Tennyson's poem "Ulysses". He reads the same poem at the end of his final show at KACL, where he thanks the staff and listeners for the past eleven years before closing with his signature words "Goodnight, Seattle."

Frasier finishes his story just as the plane lands, giving viewers a surprise: Frasier was landing in Chicago, where Charlotte had moved, and not to San Francisco. He says, "Wish me luck," to Anne, then looks out of the plane window as the screen fades to black.

Frasier's farewell speech
The poem Frasier quotes in this episode is a shortened version of Alfred, Lord Tennyson's "Ulysses":
"It may be that the gulfs will wash us down;
It may be we shall touch the Happy Isles,
And though we are not now that strength which in old days
Moved earth and heaven, that which we are, we are—
[Scene shifts to Frasier's KACL booth.]
Made weak by time and fate, but strong in will;
To strive, to seek, to find, and not to yield."
I've been thinking about that poem a lot lately. And I think what it says is that, while it's tempting to play it safe, the more we're willing to risk, the more alive we are. In the end, what we regret most are the chances we never took.  And I hope that explains, at least a little, this journey on which I am about to embark. I have loved every minute with my KACL family, and all of you. For eleven years you've heard me say, "I'm listening." Well, you were listening, too. And for that I am eternally grateful. Goodnight, Seattle.

Reception

The episode was viewed by 33.7 million people, being the 11th-most-watched series finale and the 7th-most-watched from NBC.

The episode had an overwhelmingly positive reception. In 2011, the finale was ranked #17 on the TV Guide Network special, TV's Most Unforgettable Finales.

References

External links
Goodnight, Seattle Part 1 and 2 at tv.com

2004 American television episodes
American television series finales
Frasier episodes